Aisby may refer to:
Aisby, South Kesteven, Lincolnshire
Aisby, West Lindsey, Lincolnshire